Santirbazar railway station is a railway station in Santirbazar, South Tripura District, Tripura, India.

Santir Bazar railway station  is a railway station in Santirbazar, South Tripura district, Tripura, India.

Its code is SNTBR. It serves Santirbazar town which is about 3 km east of the station. The station lies on the Agartala–Sabroom rail section, which comes under the Lumding railway division of the Northeast Frontier Railway. The segment from Agartala to Sabroom via Udaipur became operational on 3 October 2019.

References

Railway stations in South Tripura district
Lumding railway division
Proposed railway stations in India